East Hereford is a municipality of about 260 people in southeastern Quebec, Canada, in Coaticook Regional County Municipality in the Estrie region.

East Hereford is located just north of Beecher Falls, Vermont, and on the east side of East Hereford it is bordered by New Hampshire. Halls Stream, a south-flowing tributary of the Connecticut River, forms the eastern boundary of the municipality and the Canada–United States border. Dairy farming and lumber products are the main sources of income in the area.

The nearby Mont Hereford has a developed trail network for the sport of mountain biking.

Demographics

Population
Population trend:

References

External links

Municipalities in Quebec
Incorporated places in Estrie
Coaticook Regional County Municipality